854 Frostia is a main-belt asteroid orbiting the sun. It was discovered in 1916 by Sergei Ivanovich Belyavsky from Simeiz Observatory in Crimea and is named after Edwin Brant Frost, an American astronomer.

A satellite, designated S/2004 (854) 1, was identified based on light curve observations in July 2004 by Raoul Behrend, Laurent Bernasconi, Alain Klotz, and Russell I. Durkee.

References

External links 
 Discovery Circumstances: Numbered Minor Planets (1)-(5000) – Minor Planet Center
 (854) Frostia, datasheet, johnstonsarchive.net
 Asteroids with Satellites, Robert Johnston, johnstonsarchive.net
 IAUC 8389 announcing the satellite
 
 

000854
Discoveries by Sergei Belyavsky
Named minor planets
000854
19160403
20040717